Davide Facchin (born 29 April 1987) is an Italian former footballer who played as a goalkeeper.

Club career 
After spending six years at Milan in their youth teams, Facchin was loaned out to Olbia for the 2007–08 season. The young goalkeeper was regularly in the starting line-up throughout the whole season.

The following year he was sent to Padova on another loan spell. This time though, the then 21-year-old was the backup keeper and collected only three appearances.

At the start of the 2009–10 season, Facchin was loaned out for the third time, this time to Pavia. However, he was again employed as the backup keeper and made only four appearances throughout the season. In July 2010 Pavia signed Facchin outright after his contract with Milan expired.

On 31 January 2014 Facchin was signed by South Tyrol in a temporary deal; after the loan falls to Pavia where he will play for another two years; in the summer of 2016 goes to Venezia. Facchin's contract was terminated by mutual consent on 17 June 2019.

On 11 July 2019, he signed a 2-year contract with Como.

On 7 May 2022 he announced his retirement.

References

External links 

Profile at Assocalciatori.it 
Profile at EmozioneCalcio.it 

1987 births
Living people
People from San Donà di Piave
Italian footballers
Association football goalkeepers
A.C. Milan players
Olbia Calcio 1905 players
Calcio Padova players
F.C. Pavia players
Reggina 1914 players
Venezia F.C. players
F.C. Südtirol players
Como 1907 players
Serie B players
Serie C players
Sportspeople from the Metropolitan City of Venice
Footballers from Veneto